The 1985 Southern Miss Golden Eagles football team was an American football team that represented the University of Southern Mississippi as an independent during the 1985 NCAA Division I-A football season. In their fourth year under head coach Jim Carmody, the team compiled a 7–4 record.

Schedule

References

Southern Miss
Southern Miss Golden Eagles football seasons
Southern Miss Golden Eagles football